The Lynn Sailors were a Minor League Baseball franchise that originated in 1980 in Lynn, Massachusetts. The Sailors were affiliated with the Seattle Mariners from 1980 to 1982 and with the Pittsburgh Pirates in 1983, when they were known as the Lynn Pirates. They were a member of the Eastern League in class Double-A and played at Fraser Field. After the 1983 season, the franchise was moved to Burlington, Vermont, and became the Vermont Reds.

Lynn Sailors (1980–82)
The Lynn Tigers of the New England League, the city's last professional baseball franchise, folded in the middle of the 1949 season.

The Seattle Mariners, founded as an expansion team in 1977, were slowly building out their farm system, and did not field a Double-A affiliate before 1980. During the 1979–80 offseason, the New York Yankees moved their Double-A affiliation to the Nashville Sounds of the Southern League, and the Mariners replaced them as sponsors of the relocated West Haven franchise, the Lynn Sailors. (Complicating matters further, the Oakland Athletics placed an expansion Eastern League team in West Haven called the Whitecaps and the Glens Falls White Sox also entered the EL in 1980.)

The three Sailors teams were competitive, but sparse media coverage was partially to blame for the less-than-enthusiastic showing at the gate. The maiden edition of the Sailors drew 50,786; it would be the high-water mark for the franchise's four-year history, but still ranked next to last in the Eastern League.  In the fall of 1981, after Sailor attendance dropped to 38,468, Mike Agganis, nephew of former Red Sox player and Lynn sporting legend Harry Agganis, purchased the franchise.

The 1982 Sailors captured the Eastern League North Division pennant by 5 games and swept Glens Falls in the opening round of the playoffs, before falling to West Haven in the finals.  But attendance dropped to an all-time low: 23,791—more than 28,000 fans fewer than the league's second-poorest draw.

After the season, the Mariners left Lynn and signed a player development contract with the Chattanooga Lookouts, also a Southern League franchise.

Lynn Pirates (1983)
In 1983, the Pirates were forced to move their Double-A affiliation from the Buffalo Bisons (then in the Eastern League) and succeeded the Mariners in Lynn as parent club of the renamed Lynn Pirates.

The Pirates made the playoffs with the second-best overall record in the Eastern League. They swept the Bisons in the best-of-three opening round before losing, two games to one, to the New Britain Red Sox in the finals. Because of poor regular-season attendance in Lynn (only 31,575 came through the turnstiles), all the postseason games were played on the road. The Lynn Pirates' last game was a 3–0 playoff loss at New Britain—a three-hit, 10-strikeout shutout by Roger Clemens, then finishing his first pro season. After the playoffs, the Lynn franchise moved to Burlington, Vermont, for 1984, affiliated with the Cincinnati Reds, and became the Vermont Reds. The Sailors/Pirates franchise spent five seasons (1984–88) in Burlington, and is now the Akron RubberDucks.

Professional baseball did not return to Lynn until 1996 when the Massachusetts Mad Dogs of the independent Northeast League began play at Fraser Field.

Season-by-season record

Notable players

As Seattle Mariners affiliate (1980–82)

As Pittsburgh Pirates affiliate (1983)

Notes

References

Home of the North Shore Spirit

1980 establishments in Massachusetts
1983 disestablishments in Massachusetts
Baseball teams established in 1980
Baseball teams disestablished in 1983
Defunct Eastern League (1938–present) teams
Pittsburgh Pirates minor league affiliates
Professional baseball teams in Massachusetts
Seattle Mariners minor league affiliates
Sports in Lynn, Massachusetts